Richard Frank "Rip" Wade (January 12, 1898 – June 15, 1957) was a baseball player for the Washington Senators in 1923 when he was 25 years of age. He batted left-handed and threw right-handed. He was 5' 11" in height and weighed 174 lb. He made his major league debut on April 19, 1923. His final game was on October 4, 1923.

External links 
http://www.baseball-reference.com/w/waderi01.shtml Rip Wade's Statistics

Washington Senators (1901–1960) players
Baseball players from Minnesota
1957 deaths
1898 births
Nashville Vols players
Sportspeople from Duluth, Minnesota